Kuznetsovsky is a rural locality (a khutor) in Bocharovskoye Rural Settlement, Novoanninsky District, Volgograd Oblast, Russia. The population was 237 as of 2010. There are 6 streets.

Geography 
Kuznetsovsky 14 km south of Novoanninsky (the district's administrative centre) by road. Gulyayevsky is the nearest rural locality.

References 

Rural localities in Novoanninsky District